John Scott is Republican politician who formerly served in the Ohio House of Representatives.  A native of Fairborn, Ohio, Scott initially ran for the Ohio House when long serving incumbent Herman Ankeney opted to not seek reelection in 1968.  He was sworn into his first term on January 3, 1969.

While in office, he headed a subcommittee that drafted legislation founding the Ohio Environmental Protection Agency, and sponsored bills that would penalize the state Medicaid system for late payments to doctors and that would make state board of education districts coincide with congressional districts.

In 1976, Scott opted to not seek reelection, and was succeeded by Jim Zehner.

References

Republican Party members of the Ohio House of Representatives
Living people
Year of birth missing (living people)